Umar ibn Dhubayʾa (Arabic: عَمرو بن ضُبَیعَة) or Amr ibn Dhubayʿa ibn Qays ibn Thaʿlaba al-Dhubaʿi (Arabic:عَمرو بن ضُبَیعَة بن قیس بن ثَعلَبة الضُبَعی ) was a part of Umar ibn Sa'd's army But before the day of Ashura, he joined Hussain ibn Ali's camp and was martyred at the Battle of Karbala.

In the Karbala 
Umar b. Dhubayʿa was on the side of Umar b. Sa'd's army. However, when he saw that the suggestions of Hussain ibn Ali were not accepted by the army of Umar b. Sa'd and they did not allow him to return, he  joined Husayn. He was martyred in the first attack of the army of Umar b. Sa'd.

In the Ziarat al-Shuhada, he has been blessed.

References 

Husayn ibn Ali
Hussainiya
People killed at the Battle of Karbala

600s births
680 deaths
Year of birth uncertain